Frank McClintock may refer to:

 Frank McLintock (born 1939), Scottish former footballer
 Frank A. McClintock (1921–2011), American mechanical engineer in material science